Madisyn Cox (born May 30, 1995) is an American former swimmer specialising in individual medley events.

College career
For the Texas Longhorns she was named the 2015 and 2017 Big 12 Conference Swimmer of the Year.  She is a 10-time All-American.

International career

2014
She competed in the 4 × 200-meter freestyle relay at the Short Course World Championships.

2015
Cox took silver in 200-meter individual medley at the 2015 Summer Universiade.

2016
She won bronze in the 400-meter individual medley at the 2016 Short Course World Championships.  She had originally finished 4th, but was elevated to bronze, along with teammate Ella Eastin being elevated to silver, when Ánh Viên Nguyễn was disqualified from second place.

2017
Cox qualified to swim the 200-meter individual medley at the World Championships after finishing second at the 2017 US Nationals. She went on to win the bronze medal in Budapest with a time of 2:09.71. She also won a gold medal as a prelim swimmer of the 4x200 freestyle relay.

2018
Cox was banned from competition for six months after a urine sample taken in February 2018 tested positive for trimetazidine. FINA initially reduced her suspension from four years to two years because of Cox's testimony that she did not knowingly ingest the performance-enhancing drug, but would not reduce it further without evidence of the source of the trimetazidine. Upon analysis of both opened and sealed bottles of Cooper Complete Elite Athletic multivitamins, the Court of Arbitration for Sport determined that the multivitamins were the source, and reduced Cox's suspension to six months. The suspension expired on September 3, 2018. However, as United States Swimming World Championship trials occurred during her suspension, Cox was not able to qualify for the 2019 World Aquatics Championships.

2021

At the 2021 U.S. Olympic Swimming Trials, Cox finished third in the 200 meter individual medley, touching in 2:09.34, missing second place by 0.02 seconds. Her lifetime best time of 2:08.51, swum at the 2021 Longhorn Invite just one month before Olympic Trials, would have qualified her for the Olympic Team, and was also 0.01 seconds faster than the gold medal winning time at the 2020 Summer Olympics. Cox previously announced that she would be retiring from the sport following the 2021 season, in order to begin medical school at the McGovern Medical School, part of the University of Texas Health Science Center at Houston. She subsequently announced her retirement on social media at the conclusion of the meet.

References

External links
 
 

1995 births
Living people
American female medley swimmers
Sportspeople from Lubbock, Texas
Texas Longhorns women's swimmers
Universiade medalists in swimming
Universiade silver medalists for the United States
World Aquatics Championships medalists in swimming
Medalists at the FINA World Swimming Championships (25 m)
Medalists at the 2015 Summer Universiade
Lubbock High School alumni
21st-century American women